A partial lunar eclipse took place on 4 June 2012. It was the first of two lunar eclipses occurring in 2012, the second eclipse set to happen on 28 November. The moon was about 37% covered by the Earth's northern umbral shadow at maximum eclipse.

Visibility 

This lunar eclipse, occurring during June's "Strawberry" full moon was completely visible over Australia, rising over eastern Asia and setting over western North America. New England and eastern Canada missed the entire eclipse since the event began after moonset in those regions. The eclipse was visible in the central United States.

Amongst those in North America, observers in western Canada and the USA had the best views with moonset occurring sometime after mid-eclipse.

Gallery

Related eclipses

Eclipses of 2012 
 An annular solar eclipse on 20 May.
 A partial lunar eclipse on 4 June.
 A total solar eclipse on 13 November.
 A penumbral lunar eclipse on 28 November.

Lunar year (354 days) 

This eclipse was one of five lunar eclipses in a short-lived series. The lunar year series repeats after 12 lunations or 354 days (Shifting back about 10 days in sequential years). Because of the date shift, the Earth's shadow will be about 11 degrees west in sequential events.

Half-Saros cycle
A lunar eclipse will be preceded and followed by solar eclipses by 9 years and 5.5 days (a half saros). This lunar eclipse is related to two annular solar eclipses of Solar Saros 147.

Tzolkinex 
 Preceded: Lunar eclipse of April 24, 2005

 Followed: Lunar eclipse of July 16, 2019

See also 
List of lunar eclipses and List of 21st-century lunar eclipses

References

External links

 
 Hermit eclipse: 2012-06-04
 NightSkyInfo.com: Lunar Eclipse Monday, 4 June 2012

2012-06
2012 in science
June 2012 events